Stewart County is a county located on the northwestern corner of Middle Tennessee, in the U.S. state of Tennessee. As of the 2020 census, the population was 13,657. Its county seat is Dover. Stewart County is part of the Clarksville Metropolitan Statistical Area.

History
Stewart County was created by European Americans in 1803 from a portion of Montgomery County, and was named for Duncan Stewart, an early settler and state legislator.  The first County Court met in March 1804. According to Goodspeed's history of Stewart County, "Stewart County was settled principally by North Carolinians, the first of whom came some time about 1795, that State having issued military grants to survivors of the Continental war, which called for large tracts of land lying in this county". It was settled during the early migration of pioneers from Virginia to the west after the American Revolutionary War. They pushed Native American peoples, such as the Cherokee, out of the area. (Please supply sources proving that the early pioners were from Virginia.)

During the American Civil War, the Battle of Fort Donelson took place in February 1862. Union forces took control of the state, occupying several strategic areas. In August 1862 their forces partially burned  the county seat, Dover, to prevent its re-capture by Confederate Lt. Col. Thomas G. Woodward.  A second battle in the area, commonly called the Battle of Dover, took place in February 1863.

Tobaccoport Saltpeter Cave was intensely mined for saltpeter, possibly during the War of 1812 but more likely not until the Civil War.  Saltpeter is the main ingredient of gunpowder and was obtained by leaching the earth from the cave.  The Union took control of Tennessee and this area in February 1862, early in the Civil War. It seems unlikely that mining could have happened before that.

Geography

The county lies in a rugged section of the northwestern Highland Rim. The Cumberland River (part of Lake Barkley) traverses the county. The Tennessee River (part of Kentucky Lake) provides the county's border with Henry County to the west.

Federal and state agencies control nearly 44% of the land in the county.

Adjacent counties
Trigg County, Kentucky (north)
Christian County, Kentucky (northeast)
Montgomery County (east)
Houston County (south)
Benton County (southwest)
Henry County (west)
Calloway County, Kentucky (northwest)

National protected areas
 Cross Creeks National Wildlife Refuge
 Fort Donelson National Battlefield (part)
 Land Between the Lakes National Recreation Area (part)

State protected areas
Barkley Wildlife Management Area
Stewart State Forest

Demographics

2020 census

As of the 2020 United States census, there were 13,657 people, 5,178 households, and 3,355 families residing in the county.

2000 census
As of the census of 2000, there were 12,370 people, 4,930 households, and 3,653 families residing in the county. There were 5,977 housing units at an average density of 13 per square mile (5/km2). The racial makeup of the county was 95.27% White, 1.29% Black or African American, 0.61% Native American, 1.46% Asian, 0.05% Pacific Islander, 0.23% from other races, and 1.10% from two or more races.  1.00% of the population were Hispanic or Latino of any race.

There were 4,930 households, out of which 31.50% had children under the age of 18 living with them, 62.30% were married couples living together, 8.10% had a female householder with no husband present, and 25.90% were non-families. 23.10% of all households were made up of individuals, and 10.80% had someone living alone who was 65 years of age or older.  The average household size was 2.49 and the average family size was 2.91.

In the county, the population was spread out, with 23.90% under the age of 18, 7.50% from 18 to 24, 28.40% from 25 to 44, 25.40% from 45 to 64, and 14.90% who were 65 years of age or older.  The median age was 39 years. For every 100 females, there were 99.10 males.  For every 100 females age 18 and over, there were 96.50 males.

The median income for a household in the county was $32,316, and the median income for a family was $38,655. Males had a median income of $31,106 versus $21,985 for females. The per capita income for the county was $16,302.  About 10.60% of families and 12.40% of the population were below the poverty line, including 12.90% of those under age 18 and 15.60% of those age 65 or over.

Politics

The county is part of Tennessee's 7th congressional district. From the antebellum period, conservative whites historically voted Democratic, adding to the Southern Block. Residents of eastern Tennessee had been Unionist and supported the Republican Party.

In the late 20th century realignment of political parties, many white conservatives shifted into the Republican Party. Before Richard Nixon's campaign in 1972, no Republican had ever won as much as thirty percent of Stewart County's vote, but he won by a landslide in the South. Until 2000 Richard Nixon was the only GOP presidential candidate to gain forty percent of the vote in the country.

Before 2000, the Democratic presidential candidate lost Stewart County only in 1968, when segregationist  George Wallace ran for the American Independent Party. After that Stewart County was one of only six Wallace counties to support Democratic candidate George McGovern.

Since the turn of the 21st century, Stewart County's voters have increasingly supported Republican candidates in recent presidential elections. In the 2008 presidential election, John McCain received approximately 53.7% of the vote; he was the first Republican to carry the county. For 100 years before that, Stewart County was the sole county in Tennessee that had never voted in majority for a Republican presidential candidate. In 2016, Republican Donald Trump gained a proportion of votes here that was only marginally less than that of the GOP gained in the historically Unionist counties of East Tennessee and the Highland Rim.

Media

Radio stations
WTPR-FM 101.7 - "The Greatest Hits of All Time"
WTPR-AM 710 - "The Greatest Hits of All Time"
WRQR-FM 105.5 - "Today's Best Music with Ace & TJ in the Morning"

Newspaper 
 The Stewart County Standard

Communities

City
Dover (county seat)

Towns
Cumberland City
Tennessee Ridge (mostly in Houston County)

Unincorporated communities
 Bear Spring
 Big Rock
 Bumpus Mills
 Indian Mound
 Leatherwood

See also
 National Register of Historic Places listings in Stewart County, Tennessee

Notes

References

External links

 Official website
 Stewart County Chamber of Commerce
 Stewart County Schools
 www.stewartcountystandard.com
 TNGenWeb
 
 Stewart County Fire Rescue

 
1803 establishments in Tennessee
Clarksville metropolitan area
Populated places established in 1803
Middle Tennessee